The Battle of Nola was a battle during the Social War (91–88 BC) in which the Romans defeated a rebel force under Cluentius. After the battle was won, the Romans chased the rebels to Nola, which kept its gate shut. During their flight, 23,000 rebels were killed before the gates of Nola.

References

Nola
1st century BC in the Roman Republic
Nola
Metropolitan City of Naples